"Don't Tell Me Lies" is the debut single by British band Breathe. An original composition by the group, the lyrics were written by David Glasper, with music by Marcus Lillington, Ian Spice and Michael Delahunty.

The song was recorded in 1985 with producer Bob Sargeant, and originally released as a single in the United Kingdom in January 1986. The single peaked at #77 on the UK Singles Chart during March 1986 and provided the band with its first national exposure.

"Don't Tell Me Lies" was not included by Siren Records on the original 10-track British issue of the album All That Jazz. In the United States however, A&M Records substituted album track 9 "For Love or Money" with a special U.S. edit of the extended dance mix of “Don’t Tell Me Lies,” remixed by John Morales. This same track was later added to the British version of album upon its re-release with 11 tracks in September 1988.

Track listings 
UK 7” Single (SIREN 11)

A. "Don’t Tell Me Lies" - 3:44

B. "Moments" - 3:48

UK 12” Single (SIREN 11-12)

A. "Don’t Tell Me Lies" [Extended Version] - 5:40

B. "Moments" [Extended Version] - 4:26

UK Double 12” Single (SIREN 11-13)

A1. "Don’t Tell Me Lies" [Extended Version] - 5:40

A2. "Moments" [Extended Version] - 4:26

B1. "Don’t Tell Me Lies" [Dance Mix] - 6:49

B2. "Don’t Tell Me Lies" [12” Dub Mix] - 3:44

Lyrics by David Glasper; Music by Marcus Lillington, Ian Spice, Michael Delahunty. All songs published by Virgin Music, Inc.

Personnel

Band 

 David Glasper (vocals)
 Marcus Lillington (guitar)
 Michael Delahunty (bass guitar)
 Ian Spice (drums)

Production 

 Remixing: John Morales (Don’t Tell Me Lies [Dance Mix])
 Design: Caryn Gough
 Photography: Amanda Searle

Music video 
The original music video for "Don't Tell Me Lies" was produced by Roger Hunt, directed by Simon Milne, and carries a production date of 20 December 1985.

Chart performance 
"Don't Tell Me Lies" spent a total of five weeks on the Top 100 singles chart in the United Kingdom. Charting at #94 on 8 February 1986, the single dropped out of the top 100 the following week. On 22 February it re-entered at #82, reaching #80 the next week, before peaking at #77 on 8 March 1986. The single sat at #100 for its final week on the chart.

1989 re-release 

After the success of “Hands to Heaven” and “How Can I Fall?”, A&M Records released “Don’t Tell Me Lies” in a new mix by Tom Lord-Alge on 3 January 1989 as Breathe’s fourth single in the United States. The song peaked at #10 on the Billboard Hot 100 singles chart, and at #5 on the Billboard Hot Adult Contemporary chart.

Siren Records waited until March 1989 before issuing the Lord-Alge mix as the group’s ninth single in Britain, where it reached #45 on the Top 100 singles chart.

Track listings 
UK 7” single (SIREN SRN109) 

A. "Don’t Tell Me Lies" [1989 Final 7” Version] - 3:44

B. "Monday Morning Blues" - 3:58

The U.K. 7” single was also offered in a limited-edition box, with an A3 poster of the band, plus a postcard for each of the three band members (SRNX 109).

US 7” single (A&M AM-1267) Cassette Single (A&M TS-1267) 

A. "Don’t Tell Me Lies" [1989 Final 7” Version] - 3:44

B. "Liberties of Love" - 3:30

The U.S. cassette single contains both tracks on each side of the cassette.

UK 12” single (SIREN SRNT109)

A1. "Don’t Tell Me Lies" [Extended Version] - 5:40

B1. "Don’t Tell Me Lies" [1989 Final 7” Version] - 3:44

B2. "Monday Morning Blues" - 3:58

US 12” single (A&M SP-12296)

A1. "Don’t Tell Me Lies" [12” Mix] - 5:38

A2. "Don’t Tell Me Lies" [1989 Final 7” Version] - 3:41

B1. "Don’t Tell Me Lies" [Full Version] - 4:08

B2. "Liberties of Love" - 3:30

UK CD mini-single (SIREN SRNCD 109)

 "Don’t Tell Me Lies" [1989 Final 7” Version] - 3:44
 "Liberties of Love" [Extended Version] - 6:21
 "Monday Morning Blues" - 3:58
 "Don’t Tell Me Lies" [Extended Version] - 5:40

All songs written by David Glasper, Marcus Lillington, Michael Delahunty and Ian Spice except “Liberties Of Love” written by David Glasper/Danny Schogger. All songs published by Virgin Music, Inc. except “Liberties Of Love” published by Virgin Music, Inc./Schogger Songs Ltd.

Five different versions of "Don't Tell Me Lies" are presented on the 2013 deluxe edition of All That Jazz.

Music video 
A new music video for "Don't Tell Me Lies" directed by The Molotov Brothers

Personnel

Band 

 David Glasper (vocals)
 Marcus Lillington (guitar)
 Michael Delahunty (bass guitar)
 Ian Spice (drums)

Production 

 Engineer: Chris Porter (“Monday Morning Blues”); John Madden (“Liberties Of Love”).
 Mixing: Bob Sargeant (“Don’t Tell Me Lies”); Chris Porter (“Liberties Of Love”); Harvey Goldberg (“Liberties Of Love” [Extended Version]).
 Remixing: Tom Lord-Alge (“Don’t Tell Me Lies”).
 Design: Bill Smith Design.
 Photography: Peter Mountain (U.K. cover).

Chart performance 
In the United States, "Don't Tell Me Lies" debuted at #96 on the Billboard Hot 100 singles chart for the week of 14 January 1989. Peaking at #10 on March 18, the song spent a total of sixteen weeks in the top 100. In reaching #10, Breathe became the first act in A&M’s 27-year history to pull three top ten singles from its debut album. On the Billboard Hot Adult Contemporary chart, the song reached #5 on 8 April 1989, spending a total of twenty weeks on that chart after its debut on January 21.

In the United Kingdom, "Don't Tell Me Lies" hit a top placing of #45 in the Top 100 singles on March 25, and spent six weeks on the chart.

References

External links
 
 

1985 songs
1986 debut singles
1987 singles
1989 singles
Breathe (British band) songs
Song recordings produced by Bob Sargeant
A&M Records singles